Yurlunggur is a genus of fossil snake in the extinct family Madtsoiidae containing the species Yurlunggur camfieldensis known from the Oligocene and Miocene of Australia.

It is closely related to Wonambi naracoortensis, present in Australia during the Pleistocene.

The name of the genus is derived from traditional name given by the people of Arnhem Land to the Rainbow serpent. They closely resemble Varanus (monitors) more than small burrowing lizards. John Scanlon has presented this as evidence of descent from the former, rather than burrowing ancestors that evolved into the elongate and legless snakes. The fossil material described by this species includes a rare example of a complete skull and mandible, often crushed in the fossilisation process, that was preserved in the soft limestone of a body of fresh water. This was found at the Riversleigh fossil site in northwest Queensland.

In 2018, researchers have suggested that this genus was a fossorial or semi-fossorial animal.

References

Prehistoric snakes
Miocene lepidosaurs
Paleogene reptiles of Australia
Riversleigh fauna
Neogene reptiles of Australia
Fossil taxa described in 1992
Monotypic prehistoric reptile genera